Peter Quinn was an English professional footballer who played as an inside forward.

Career
Born in North Shields, Quinn joined Bradford City from North Shields Athletic in July 1919. He made 4 league appearances for the club, scoring once before moving to Coventry City in November 1919.

Sources

References

Date of birth missing
Date of death missing
English footballers
North Shields F.C. players
Bradford City A.F.C. players
Coventry City F.C. players
English Football League players
Association football inside forwards